The 1993 San Miguel Beermen season was the 19th season of the franchise in the Philippine Basketball Association (PBA).

Summary
The entry of Allan Caidic to the already-talented lineup of San Miguel Beermen reunites him with his former NCC teammates Samboy Lim, Hector Calma, Franz Pumaren and Yves Dignadice. Along with last season's Most Valuable Player (MVP) Ato Agustin, the Beermen now formed a threesome combo with Caidic, Lim and Agustin and were installed as heavy favorites to bag the All-Filipino crown. 

On March 2, Allan Caidic debut in San Miguel uniform as the star studded Beermen prevailed over Coney Island (formerly Purefoods), 106-98. As expected, San Miguel finish on top of the eliminations with eight wins and two defeats, losing only to newcomer Sta.Lucia Realtors and to Coney Island in the last playing date of the elimination round. The Beermen are tied with Swift after the round-robin quarterfinals among five teams with 10 wins and four losses. They advanced into the final playoffs with Coney Island by winning over Sta.Lucia Realtors, three games to one, in their best-of-five semifinal series. In the All-Filipino Cup championship rematch, the Beermen lost in six games to the equally talented Coney Island Ice Cream Stars.

The high-leaping Patrick Durham, a second round draftee by the Dallas Mavericks in 1989 and the MVP of the CBA All-Star game in the previous year, was their import in the Commissioner's Cup. The Beermen are tied with Purefoods, Shell and Alaska, going into the last playing date of the semifinals on August 22. The Beermen eliminates Shell from the finals race with a 91-82 win, setting up a sudden-death playoff with Purefoods Oodles, which beat Alaska in the first game of a knockout double-header. San Miguel lost to Purefoods, 101-119, in a playoff match for the right to face Swift in the championship series.

Kenny Travis return for the Governor's Cup and scored 49 points in San Miguel's 129-107 win over Sta.Lucia in the opening game on September 26.  The Beermen nip Swift, 112-110, in their next game on October 1 in an early clash of top favorites. San Miguel finish with the best record in the eliminations with eight wins and two losses, they dropped their first two games in the semifinals, but won their next four assignments and assured itself of a first finals berth with their 12th win in 16 games, winning over Swift for the third time in the conference, 95-89 on November 23.  

San Miguel battled the Swift Mighty Meaties, who were looking for their second straight title in the season, for the Governor's Cup crown. Behind eventual best import winner Kenny Travis, which got the better of his match-up with the high-scoring Tony Harris, the Beermen surprisingly won the finals series in just five games and clinch their 10th PBA title.

Roster

Transactions

Additions

Recruited imports

References

San Miguel Beermen seasons
San